Al Baraka Group B.S.C. ("ABG" / the “Group”) is licensed as an Investment Business Firm – Category 1 (Islamic Principles) by the Central Bank of Bahrain and is listed on Bahrain Bourse. It is a leading international Islamic financial group providing financial services through its banking subsidiaries in 15 countries offering retail, corporate, treasury and investment banking services, strictly in accordance with the principles of Islamic Shari'a.

The Group has a wide geographical presence with operations in Jordan, Egypt, Tunisia, Bahrain, Sudan, Turkey, South Africa, Algeria, Pakistan, Lebanon, Syria, Morocco and Germany, in addition to two branches in Iraq and a representative office in Libya and provides its services in more than 600 branches. ABG’s network serves a population totaling around one billion customers.

The authorized capital of ABG is US$2.5 billion

International presence
The global network of Al Baraka Group is present in 16 countries, as well under the Al Baraka and other brand names.

References

1978 establishments in Bahrain
Banks established in 1978
Banks of Bahrain
Companies listed on the Bahrain Bourse
Companies based in Manama
Investment companies
Investment